The Maltese Second Division 2007–08 (known as BOV Second Division 2007–08 due to sponsorship reasons) started on 21 September 2007 and ended on 18 May 2008. San Gwann and Naxxar Lions were relegated from 2006–07 Maltese First Division.The promoted teams from 2006–07 Maltese Third Division were Mgarr United, Sirens and Zurrieq.The league was won by San Gwann.They finished on 47 points, level with Balzan Youths and Rabat Ajax.They were declared champions for their superior goal difference. Balzan Youths and Rabat Ajax had to play a promotion play-off for the team to get promoted. The play-off was won 3-0 by Rabat Ajax. At the other end Sirens and Zurrieq were relegated while Mgarr United had to play the relegation playoffs with four teams from the Third Division. Zurrieq were relegated because they had a 5-point deduction by the Malta Football Association. They had three points deducted after failing to present the signed balance sheet. Zurrieq had another two points deducted after being found guilty of casing the incidents which led the BOV Second Division match against Luxol on April 27 to be abandoned. Referee Chris Francalanza abandoned the match on 69 minutes after he was hit by a Zurrieq player. If they were deducted no points it would have been Mgarr United relegated. Mgarr managed to win the relegation playoffs and secure their second division status for the first time.

Participating teams
 Balzan Youths
 Birzebbuga St.Peters
 Lija Athletic
 Melita
 Mgarr United
 Naxxar Lions
 Rabat Ajax
 San Gwann
 Sirens
 St.Andrews
 Santa Venera Lightning
 Zurrieq

Changes from previous season
 Dingli Swallows and Mellieha were promoted to the First Division. They were replaced with San Gwann and Naxxar Lions, both relegated from 2006–07 Maltese First Division.
 Gozo FC, Gudja United and Zebbug Rangers were relegated to the Third Division. They were replaced with Mgarr United, Sirens and Zurrieq, all promoted from 2006–07 Maltese Third Division.

Final standings

Promotion play-off

|}

Relegation-promotion play-off
Participating

Quarter final

|}
Gharghur remain in Maltese Third Division

Semi finals

|}
Xghajra and Gzira remain in Maltese Third Division

Final

|}
Mgarr remain in Maltese Second Division
Attard remain in Maltese Third Division

Top scorers

Results

Maltese Second Division seasons
Malta
3